Șandru may refer to:

 Șandru, the former name of Papiu Ilarian commune in Mureș County, Romania
 Șandru, a tributary of the Bârnărel in Suceava County, Romania
 Șandru, a tributary of the Moldova in Suceava County, Romania

Family name 
 Lavinia Șandru (born 1975), a Romanian politician
 Miroslava Șandru (1916-1983), Romanian folklorist

See also 
 Șandra, the name of two villages in Romania
 Sándor (disambiguation)

Romanian-language surnames